The Estádio Alfredo Schürig, most commonly known as Estádio Parque São Jorge, or Fazendinha, is a football stadium inaugurated on July 22, 1928 in São Paulo, Brazil.  It can hold up to 13,969 people. The stadium is owned by Sport Club Corinthians Paulista. Its formal name honors Alfredo Schürig, president of Corinthians from 1931 to 1933. Fazendinha means Little Farm.

History
The stadium was inaugurated on July 22, 1928, and became the home ground of Corinthians in the beginning of the 1940s, when Estádio do Pacaembu was built. In 1963, the stadium was one of the 1963 Pan American Games venues, hosted in São Paulo city. During the Pan American Games, the Brazil national team beat the American counterparts 10–0. Due to Fazendinha's low capacity, Corinthians has been playing in Pacaembu Stadium since the 1950s. During a short time, Campeonato Paulista and Copa do Brasil matches were again played at the stadium as result of a reformation done in 1992 that grew its capacity.

The inaugural match was played on July 22, 1928, when Corinthians and América drew 2-2. The first goal of the stadium was scored by Corinthians' De Maria.

The stadium's attendance record currently stands at 27,384, set on November 4, 1962 when Santos beat Corinthians 2–1.

References
Enciclopédia do Futebol Brasileiro, Volume 2 - Lance, Rio de Janeiro: Aretê Editorial S/A, 2001.

External links
Templos do Futebol
More Pictures

Sports venues in São Paulo
Football venues in São Paulo
Sport Club Corinthians Paulista
American football venues
1928 establishments in Brazil
Sports venues completed in 1928